Božo Đurasović (born August 7, 1987) is a Bosnian professional basketball player for Leotar of the Bosnia and Herzegovina Championship.

Playing career 
Đurasović played for the Vogošća, Bosna, Leotar Trebinje and Zrinjski of the Basketball Championship of Bosnia and Herzegovina.

Also, he played abroad for Gießen 46ers (Germany), Polytekhnika-Halychyna (Ukraine), BBC Monthey (Switzerland) in Romania for Steaua CSM EximBank București and SCM U Craiova.

On September 21, 2017, Đurasović signed a contract for the Dynamic VIP PAY of the Basketball League of Serbia and the ABA League Second Division.

Personal life 
He is a younger brother of Nikola Đurasović who is also a basketball player.

References

External links 
 Profile at aba-liga.com
 Player Profile at eurobasket.com
 Player Profile at realgm.com

1987 births
Living people
Bosnia and Herzegovina men's basketball players
Basketball League of Serbia players
BBC Monthey players
BC Politekhnika-Halychyna players
Bosnia and Herzegovina expatriate basketball people in Germany
Bosnia and Herzegovina expatriate basketball people in Serbia
Giessen 46ers players
KK Dynamic players
KK Leotar players
Basketball players from Dubrovnik
Small forwards